Lycaon sekowei is an extinct canid species from southern Africa that lived during the Pliocene and Pleistocene epochs. Like L. pictus, the other species in the genus that is alive today, L. sekowei was a hypercarnivore; however, its front paws were not as specialized for running.

References

Prehistoric canines
Pliocene carnivorans
Pleistocene carnivorans
Pliocene mammals of Africa
Pleistocene mammals of Africa
Fossil taxa described in 2010